The Box is a 2021 South Korean musical, road film directed by Yang Jung-woong for Yeonghwasa Take Co., Ltd. The film starring Park Chanyeol and Jo Dal-hwan, is about an aspiring singer and a washed-up music producer and their musical journey. The film was theatrically released on March 24, 2021 by Cine Pilwoon Co., Ltd.

Cast

 Park Chanyeol as Ji Hoon
 Jo Dal-hwan as Min-su
 Kim Ji-hyun as Na-na
 Song Seung-hwan as Audition Judge
 Gaeko - Cameo
 Kang Joo-hee (Rothy) - Cameo

Production

Theme 
The film is a road film in which two people an aspiring singer and a washed out music producer embark on a musical journey across the country. It is a jukebox musical containing familiar popular songs from world music as; Coldplay, Billie Eilish, Chet Baker, Mariah Carey, Pharrell Williams and famous Korean songs in the backdrop of South Korean locales.

Casting 
On 30 July 2020, the SM Entertainment agency announced that Park Chanyeol was confirmed to appear in musical film.

Filming 
Principal photography of the film began in the end of August 2020.

Release
It was announced on March 27, that the film will be released in thirty two International markets.

The Box is scheduled to be released in 11 countries including USA, Singapore, Indonesia, Vietnam, Japan and Australia. It will be released in Singapore on April 1, 2021, in Indonesia on April 7, 2021 and Malaysia on April 8, 2021.

Original soundtrack

60,000 albums of original soundtrack of the film were pre-sold before its release on March 31. The box album debuted at number 4 iTunes global albums, with all songs charting in more than 6 countries.

Reception

Box office
The film was released on March 24, 2021 on 372 screens. It opened at first place on the box office getting more than thirty thousand admissions on its first day.

According to Korean Film Council data, it is at 20th place among all the Korean films released in the year 2021, with gross of US$0.85 million and 122,469 admissions, .
 The system of KOBIS (Korean Box Office Information System) is managed by KOFIC.

Critical response
Going by Korean review aggregator Naver Movie Database, the film holds an approval rating of 8.63 from the audience.

Brian Tan from Yahoo Style rating the film with 3.5 out of 5 stars, praised Chanyeol for his “beautifully rendered vocals and acoustics throughout the movie” in his review. He praised Chanyeol for his ability to convey the cuteness, introversion, and most vulnerable moments of the main character. Several reviewers have cited the lack of a consistent plot and dialogue as some of the sites of improvement.

Fred Hawson reviewing for ABS-CBN News wrote that the main attraction of the film is the lead performance of EXO member Chanyeol and his song recordings. He opined that making the film a road trip added to the appeal of the director Jung-woong's concept. Explaining the premise behind the story of the film, Hawson wrote, "... simple premise -- a talented musical artist who could not bring himself to perform his music in front of people, and the producer who trusted that talent enough to spend time and money hopefully to bring him out of his shell (or box)."

Korean entertainment news site The Seoul Story praised Chanyeol's baritone singing, stating that it will "trap viewer's hearts". It was pointed out that the storyline was too predictable, but the overall viewing experience was still quite enjoyable and "light hearted."

References

External links
 
 
 
 

2020s Korean-language films
South Korean musical drama films
Films postponed due to the COVID-19 pandemic
2021 films
South Korean road movies